Borran-e Olya (also Romanized as Borrān-e ‘Olyā; also known as Barān and Borrān-e Bālā) is a village in Borran Rural District of Borran District of Aslan Duz County, Ardabil province, Iran. It was formerly in Qeshlaq-e Gharbi Rural District, of Aslan Duz District, Parsabad County before Aslan Duz became a county. At the 2006 census, its population was 1,180 in 236 households. The following census in 2011 counted 1,102 people in 275 households. The latest census in 2016 showed a population of 1,508 people in 451 households; it was the largest village in its rural district.

References 

Aslan Duz County

Populated places in Ardabil Province